Cherry Monroe is a band originating from Youngstown, Ohio and Pittsburgh, PA. They made their way into the American pop music industry with their debut single "Satellites" in July 2005, reaching No. 85 on the Billboard Hot 100.

The band formed in 2004 with Matt Toka (lead), Jason Levis (drums), David Saltman (bass), and Ryan Harris (guitar). Another guitarist, Frankie Bennett, joined later. The band was initially named The Velvet Idols, but was made to be re-named Cherry Monroe by their first record label.

Shortly afterwards the band was signed to Universal Records.

In July 2006, the label dropped the band and that lead vocalist Matt Toka to announce his departure from the band to pursue a solo music career.

In 2012, Matt Toka has released an album produced by Rob Cavallo. Matt Toka followed the release going on Warped Tour and Bamboozle Festival. He has also toured with Falling in Reverse, All American Rejects, and Breath Carolina.

Discography
 Cherry Monroe (2004)
 The Good, the Bad, and the Beautiful (2005)

References

External links
Official website
Myspace page

Alternative rock groups from Ohio
Universal Music Group artists